Judgement (XX), or in some decks spelled Judgment, is a tarot card, part of the Major Arcana suit usually comprising 22 cards.

Card meanings

Judgement
Rebirth
Inner-calling
Absolution
Karma
Causality
Second chance

Description
The traditional scene is modeled after Christian imagery of the Resurrection and Last Judgment. An angel, possibly Metatron, probably Israfil,  is depicted blowing a great trumpet, from which hangs the flag of St. George, which references the 15th chapter of 1 Corinthians.  A group of resurrected people (man, woman, and child) of sallow complexion stand, arms spread, looking up at the angel in awe. The Sleeping Dead are emerging from crypts or graves, calling back to the Book of Revelation chapter 20, where the sea gives up its dead. There are snow-covered mountains in the background indicating a winter theme, similar to The Hermit, as a symbolical ending.

Alternative decks 
 In the Thoth tarot deck, Judgement is referred to as The Aeon and includes pictorial representations of Nuit, Hadit and Ra-Hoor-Khuit and Harpocrates.

See also
Angels in art

References

Major Arcana